Shravasti district is one of the districts of the Uttar Pradesh state of India, with Bhinga town as its district headquarters. Shravasti district is a part of Devipatan Division. According to Government of India, it is among the 121 minority concentrated districts in India. It is the fourth most backward district in India, according to the 2018 Niti Aayog ranking. This district is the most poverty stricken district in the country.

History

Shravasti, the north-eastern town of Uttar Pradesh, is located near the West Rapti River. This town is closely associated with the life of Gautama Buddha, who is believed to have spent 24 Chaturmases here. Age-old stupas, majestic viharas and several temples near the village of "Sahet-Mahet" establish Buddha's association with Shravasti. According to Nagarjuna, the city had a population of 900,000 in 5th century BCE and it even overshadowed Magadha's capital, Rajgir.

As mentioned in the 'Bruhatkalpa' and various Kalpas of the fourteenth century, the name of the city was Mahid. There are subsequent mentions showing that the name of this city was Sahet-Mahet. It is also mentioned that a vast fort covered this city in which there were many temples having idols of Devkulikas.

Today a great rampart of earth and brick surrounds this city. During excavation in 'Sahet-Mahet' near Shravasti City, many ancient idols and inscriptions were found. They are now kept in museums of Mathura and Lucknow. At present, the archaeological department of the Indian Government is doing excavation to perform allied research.

Shravasti was formed in May 1997 when Bahraich district was divided.

Geography
Shravasti—part of historic Awadh—was carved out from Gonda district on the south and Bahraich district on the west. Shrawasti also borders Balrampur on the east, and Banke and Dang districts of Nepal to the north. Shravasti district headquarters Bhinga is about 170 kilometres from Lucknow, the state capital.

Economy
In 2006 the Ministry of Panchayati Raj named Shravasti one of the country's 250 most backward districts (out of a total of 640). It is one of the 34 districts in Uttar Pradesh currently receiving funds from the Backward Regions Grant Fund Programme (BRGF).

Demographics

According to the 2011 census Shravasti district has a population of 1,117,361, roughly equal to the nation of Cyprus or the US state of Rhode Island. This gives it a ranking of 414th in India (out of a total of 640). Its population growth rate over the decade 2001-2011 was -5.25%. Shrawasti has a sex ratio of 881 females for every 1000 males, and a literacy rate of 46.74%. Male literacy rate is 57.16% while that of female is 34.78%. 96.54% of district's population lives in rural areas. Approximately 0.11% (1,253 people) of the total population of the district lives on footpath or without any roof cover. Scheduled Castes and Scheduled Tribes made up 16.94% and 0.50% of the population respectively.

Religion 

Shravasti district is Hindu-majority, but has a large minority of Muslims. The district headquarters, Bhinga, is Muslim-majority. Although formerly a centre of Buddhism, only 323 Buddhists live in the district at the present-time.

Language 

At the time of the 2011 Census of India, 87.55% of the population in the district spoke Hindi, 11.17% Awadhi and 1.15% Urdu as their first language. The local dialect is Awadhi.

Villages
 

Persaura

References

 
Districts of Uttar Pradesh
Minority Concentrated Districts in India